The Day Britain Stopped is a dramatic pseudo-documentary produced by Wall to Wall Media for the BBC. It is based on a fictional disaster that took place on December 19, 2003, in which a train strike is the first in a chain of events that lead to a fatal meltdown of Britain's transport system. Directed by Gabriel Range, who wrote the script with producer Simon Finch, the film first aired on Tuesday, May 13, 2003, on BBC Two.

The drama makes use of various British television news services and newsreaders (such as Sky News and Channel 4 News), foreign news channels (such as France's TF1), radio stations (Radio Five Live), real-life archival footage (from a train crash site, a speech by Prime Minister Tony Blair and various stock footage of British traffic congestion) and several cameo roles by well-known British personalities. Accompanying music includes excerpts from the movie soundtracks of The Shawshank Redemption, The Sum of All Fears, Requiem for a Dream,  Heat, and 28 Days Later.

Plot

Between 4 and 5 December 2003, 18 months after the Potters Bar rail accident, a fatal train accident near Waverley Station in Edinburgh leads to the ASLEF and RMT trade unions to declare a strike for December 19 due to safety concerns – forcing the heavy Christmas train passenger traffic to use the roads instead and lorries to take over the transportation of rail freight. ASLEF General Secretary Mick Rix's decision to declare the strike is heavily criticised by the government, particularly by Junior Transport Minister Tom Walker.

On December 19, Julian Galt and his family are travelling into Central London from Basingstoke for last-minute Christmas shopping, then onward to Heathrow Airport where they intend to take a flight to Bilbao. Julian's son, Thomas, records their journey on a home camcorder. At the same time, Pauline Watkins and her daughter Charlie are heading to Old Trafford in Manchester when a crossover accident on the M25 motorway in Surrey involving several vehicles takes place. Inspector Clive Turner, head of the Surrey Police's Road Policing Unit makes the decision to close the motorway in both directions from the site of the accident. The resulting traffic congestion spreads at such a rate that, within minutes, the motorway is blocked at the junction with the M23. Meanwhile, as British airspace runs overcapacity to cope with the Christmas traffic, heavy traffic delays force the air traffic controllers to work a far greater number of aircraft moving through their assigned sectors than normal. Staff at the Channel Tunnel are also taking part in the rail strike, with all vehicles being rerouted to Dover for ferries to France, while Eurostar passengers are booked on to flights instead.

Attempts at relieving the gridlock are hampered by a lack of coordination between police services overseeing different sections of the motorway, leading to cases of traffic being diverted onto the same roads in opposite directions. Traffic that managed to work its way through the diversion route past the Surrey accident suffers a further setback when a chemical tanker lorry driven by Steve Thomas jackknifes and overturns on the M25 near to Heathrow Airport, causing a pile-up and further tailbacks, resulting in a second closure on the M25 in both directions for the rest of the day, and heavy delays on the M1, M2, M3, M11 and M20, all major artery roads leading to London. Re-routed traffic attempts to drive through Central London, without much success.

Charlie Watson, whose mother's car was hit in the lorry accident earlier that day, whilst travelling to Old Trafford, becomes the first fatality when her gridlocked ambulance runs out of necessary medicine.

As traffic worsens, Jerry Newell, a pilot for British Airways (BA), is being driven to Heathrow Airport by his wife, Jane, in order to reach his flight to Toulouse. Caught in the gridlock, he makes the decision to make his way to the airport on foot, while a friendly football match between England and Turkey at Old Trafford in Manchester is cancelled for low attendance, with thousands stranded on the M6 and M40, effectively shutting down Manchester and Birmingham. The message is delivered by a stunned Gary Lineker while live on Match of the Day. With flight crews now being unable to reach Heathrow on time, flights begin to get cancelled.

Meanwhile, the Galt family are held up on the M25 along with countless other motorists after the tanker crash. Numerous people try to escape the motorway in their cars or on foot but are stopped by the Thames Valley Police, who  escort people back to their cars on foot and have motorcycle officers pursue and stop fleeing vehicles from going off-road. As night falls, hypothermia sets in among many of the stranded motorists. Julian's wife notices that Heathrow is less than a mile away on foot and after Julian is successfully convinced by his wife to lead the family to the airport, the group sneak past immobilised cars and police officers to get off the motorway, walking through farm fields in the darkness to reach a minibus waiting on a minor road. After taking his son's camera, Julian tells his family that he's going to return to the car so it isn’t towed away and that he'll catch the next flight to Bilbao in the morning.

Severe hypothermia now incapacitates numerous vulnerable motorists, and several more of the trapped drivers begin to die of exposure. The authorities realise their attempts to force people to stay with their vehicles are making the situation worse and so "Operation Gridlock", an emergency contingency plan authorised by the government, is implemented. Motorists are now instructed to leave their vehicles and make their way to shelters adjacent to the roads for triage and evaluation, whereupon further transport will eventually be arranged. People most at risk are taken to field hospitals near the shelters for triage. Meanwhile, the BA flight to Bilbao is cleared for pushback at Heathrow.

West Drayton approach controller Nicola Evans volunteers to work overtime when her replacement, stranded amidst the gridlocked traffic, does not turn up on time. Overworked, she forgets to reduce the speed of a Czech Airlines cargo flight that is tucked in behind an Aer Lingus jet on final approach and the separation between the two planes begins to rapidly decrease. If left unchecked, the Aer Lingus flight would not have enough time to exit the runway before the Czech flight touched down on the same runway. Meanwhile, the BA flight is cleared for take-off on the parallel runway.

Suddenly realising her mistake, Nicola struggles to issue the cargo flight an instruction to go-around. The pilots eventually receive the message and follow the order, thus avoiding a collision with the incoming Aer Lingus flight, but unbeknownst to them, the aircraft is now climbing directly into the flight path of the departing British Airways flight. The two planes collide at 1,800 feet (550 m), a mile north-east of the airport – all passengers and crew on board both planes are killed upon impact. The explosion is seen across Heathrow and the settlements nearby; burning wreckage and aviation fuel showers across much of Hounslow, flattening streets and setting areas of the town and its surroundings on fire.

Emergency services struggle to reach the scene due to the clogged roads, ultimately resorting to using minor roads. Due to the proximity of Heathrow to the crash site, the airport's fire services are sent out to assist in the rescue efforts – but this, in turn, forces the airport to close. Though other airports are initially used for diversions, the airspace is subsequently shut until further notice. Jane returns to her home in Shepperton several hours after Jerry left her car to walk to the airport and finds news coverage of the disaster on the television. She begins to worry and tries contacting the staff at the airport for information about whether her husband was okay. She is notified that the flight involved in the disaster was departing to Bilbao and is briefly calmed. However, she then receives a phone call from British Airways telling her that Jerry's flight to Toulouse was cancelled; he instead had been called into captain the flight to Bilbao and was killed in the crash.

Walking back to the motorway, Julian arrives at one of the Operation Gridlock shelters, where he hears from a radio broadcast that an air accident has taken place at London Heathrow. His decision to return to the motorway to ensure his car wasn't taken away saved his life, but his wife and two children are dead.

Nicola Evans and two other air traffic controllers are dismissed from their jobs and eventually put on trial for multiple manslaughter charges for their negligence. The charges are dropped after revelations over larger issues in Heathrow's air-traffic control to do with the missed approach procedure, and the similarity in the disaster to a previous near-miss (also fictitious), causing the prosecution's case to collapse in the process. The final death toll of the disaster was 87 people all 64 passengers and crew, and 23 on the ground were killed. There were also five deaths from hypothermia on the motorways and eight elsewhere. Amid rising pressure from the government, ASLEF and RMT order the strikes to be halted, bringing an end to the crisis.

One year later, a memorial service is held at St Bride's Church in Central London for the victims who died in the events.

Cast
Eric Carte as Tom Walker
Andy Shield as Inspector Clive Turner
Steve North as Julian Galt
Angelo Andreou as Tomas Galt
Emma Pinto as Ana Galt
Olivia MacDonald as Marina Galt
Prue Clarke as Pauline Watkins
Jonathan Linsley as PC Tony Foster
Tony Longhurst as Steve Thomas
David Holt as Dominic Steel
Joanna Griffiths as Nicola Evans
Alison Skot as Air Traffic Controller
Daniel Copeland as Matt Ogden
Nancy McClean as Jane Newell
Rebekah Janes as a concerned woman
Satnam Bhogal as Inesh Gunwadena
Tim Crouch as Daniel Boyd
Julie Wilson Nimmo as TV phone witness (uncredited)

Tim Pigott-Smith provided the narration. Katie Derham, Charlotte Green, Philip Hayton, John Humphrys, Gary Lineker, Anna Rajan, Jon Snow and Kirsty Young appeared as themselves.

Archive footage of Prime Minister Tony Blair was used, combining parts of his statements in the House of Commons about Air France Flight 4590 and the Great Heck rail crash.

Production
The M96 motorway, a converted airfield used by the Fire Service College for training, was used as a stage for the M25.

Director Gabriel Range explains how he and the production team went about realistically recreating the disaster:

Reception
Radio Times said: "Scarily realistic ... chilling ... a remarkable piece of reality-based drama ... a credible scenario ... a wonderful piece of television ... so plausibly done that it should really have a warning flash in the corner of the screen saying 'fiction' in big red letters ... loving pastiches of news reports, corporate videos, magazine covers, press conferences - the fakery is fascinating, like looking at a forged banknote. It works as a smart riveting drama and also as a warning of the power of the financial markets".

In response to the programme's original broadcast, the following statement was issued by National Air Traffic Services:

References

External links
 

British docufiction films
BBC television docudramas
Films set in 2003
Films set in the United Kingdom
2003 television films
2003 films
2003 in British television
British television films
Films about aviation accidents or incidents
2000s British films